Jon Brody Liddiard (born June 12, 1977) is a former American football long snapper of the National Football League. He was signed by the New York Giants as an undrafted free agent in 2000. He played college football at Colorado.

Early years
Liddiard attended Torrey Pines High School in San Diego, California, where he played both long snapper and tight end. He then went on to play college football at the University of Colorado.

NFL career
Liddiard signed with the Minnesota Vikings as an undrafted free agent on April 25, 2000 following the 2000 NFL Draft, but he was cut during training camp on August 14. On August 20, he signed with the New York Giants. After signing with the practice squad on September 4, Liddiard was promoted to the active roster September 9 but was released two days later without appearing in a game. On November 23, he signed with the Miami Dolphins and appeared in five games.

He then spent the next three seasons playing for the Minnesota Vikings as the team's long snapper and reserve tight end, appearing in all 16 games those three seasons.

Following the 2003 season, Liddiard had surgery to repair his injured shoulder. He spent the following pre-season competing with rookie Cullen Loeffler for long snapping duties. Liddiard was given his release on September 4, 2004.

References

External links
 SI.com profile

1977 births
Living people
American football long snappers
American football tight ends
Colorado Buffaloes football players
Miami Dolphins players
Minnesota Vikings players
New York Giants players
Players of American football from Salt Lake City
Players of American football from San Diego